World Distributors (known colloquially as "Pembertons") was a British publisher and distributor of magazines and comic books. The company was known for repackaging American comics and producing comic book annuals based on licensed properties. For a period, the company was the lone distributor of American comics in the UK. Pembertons was owned and operated by the brothers Alfred, John, and Sydney Pemberton, originally based in Manchester.

History 
The Pemberton brothers started out as second-hand booksellers in Manchester. Around 1940, they began a book distribution business, T. A. & E. Pemberton.

1945–1952: Paperback books 
In 1945, shortly after World War II, they became a publisher of lurid and sensationalist paperback books; one series was known as "Thrilling Love." At this point the brothers created the company name World Distributors/Sydney Pemberton (the company was incorporated as World Distributors (Manchester) Limited on 2 May 1949).

The paperback craze died down in the period 1951–1952, partly as the result of Home Office clampdowns on "obscene and objectionable publications;" by the end of 1952, the Pembertons had mostly left the paperback publication business (though the company continued publishing books sporadically in the following decades).

1947–1959: Reprint comics 
From 1947 to 1959, World Distributors published black-and-white ongoing comic book titles. These were mostly reprints of American Western titles, many from the Dell Comics backlist.

The company's first foray into comics, however, was 1947's Super Thriller Comic, an anthology comic of original stories by British creators (featuring "Ace Hart the Atom Man"), which was picked up with Superthriller issue #11 from the Edinburgh-based printer/publisher Foldes. Super Thriller Comic ran for 22 issues until issue #33 (1950) when it became the cowboy comic Western Super Thriller Comics, running an additional 49 issues to #82 before it was canceled. As Western Super Thriller Comics, it featured the Rawhide Kid (not the same Rawhide Kid published by Marvel).

World Distributors' longest-running Western reprint titles included Roy Rogers Comics (100 issues and 12 annuals, 1951–1963), John Wayne Adventure Comics (82 issues and six annuals, 1950–1960), The Lone Ranger (66 issues and 12 annuals, 1953–1976), and Red Ryder Comics (62 issues, 1954–1959).

The few non-Western-themed comics titles which had extended runs during the 1950s were A Movie Classic (88 issues, 1956–1959), which featured adaptations of popular movies; and Walt Disney Series (52 issues, 1956– 1959), reprints from the Dell Comics title Walt Disney's Comics and Stories.

As Western comics faded in popularity, World Distributors had canceled most of their ongoing titles by 1959.

1950s–1980s: Annuals 
World Distributors may be best known for the hardback annuals they published based on popular film, television, animation, and comics properties. The annuals generally contained comics (often reprints from American titles) mixed with illustrated text stories, word games, and puzzles. Beginning in 1951 and continuing into the mid-1980s, the annuals were published in the autumn of each year for the holiday gift-giving season, displaying next year's date (if any date at all) on the cover to prolong shelf-life. World Distributors shipped unsold copies to overseas markets such as New Zealand and Australia, where they still had the current year's date despite the time taken for transport.

World Distributors' longest-running annuals included Bugs Bunny (21 issues, 1951–1981), Doctor Who (20 issues, 1965–1985), Yogi Bear (17 issues, 1961–1980), Tom and Jerry (14 issues, 1967–1985), The Lone Ranger (13 issues, 1956–1976), and Star Trek (13 issues, 1969–1985). Other notable annuals published featured The Adventures of Champion, Gobots, Thunderbirds, Top Cat, The Man from U.N.C.L.E., Voyage to the Bottom of the Sea, Gary Glitter, and UK television properties like Basil Brush, Dad's Army, Just William, Blake's 7, TV Tornado, Terry Nation's Dalek, and Thomas the Tank Engine.

1960s: Illustrated World Library, World Adventure Library, and Famepress titles 
In 1965, the Pembertons returned to publishing ongoing comics series with the "Illustrated World Library" line, which featured romance, horror-suspense, western, and war comics. The line started with Illustrated Romance Library and Thriller; and increased in 1970 with three more ongoing titles: Picture Romance, Sundance Western, and War Hero. A number of the "Illustrated World Library" titles lasted into the late 1970s.

To augment the "Illustrated World Library" line, in 1966 the Pembertons launched the "World Adventure Library" line of titles, featuring action heroes like Batman, Superman, Flash Gordon, Mandrake the Magician, the Phantom, and Tarzan; as well as comic book versions of Bonanza and The Man from U.N.C.L.E. The "World Adventure Library" line, however, had petered out by the end of 1967.

Also in 1966 World Distributors acquired a number of ongoing titles from   Famepress, a UK publisher which began operating in 1960. Long-running titles picked up from Famepress included the Western title Pecos Bill Picture Library, the romance comic  Young Lovers, the adventure comic Top Three Adventure Picture Library, and the war comic Battleground. World Distributors gave up on the Famepress titles after about two years, however; many of them were in turn acquired by Alex White in 1967/1968. (Alex White appears to have gone defunct shortly thereafter.)

1970s: American comics distributor 
The company was for a time in the 1970s, the official distributor of American comics in the UK, an arrangement which ended in the early 1980s.

1980: World International 
In 1980, the company became known as World International Publishing, Ltd., but due to falling sales limiting their publishing activities. In 1991 they moved to new offices in Handforth, Cheshire, still operating as World International and publishing annuals in much lesser volume. The company went defunct in 1993; the Pemberton brothers were no longer affiliated with the company by this point.

In mid-1995, the business was revived as World International Limited and moved offices to London.

1999: Sale to Egmont 
The Egmont Group acquired World International in early 1999, and it became known as Egmont World Limited, eventually becoming Egmont Children's Books (Egmont Books Limited).  Egmont had previously purchased the Fleetway arm of IPC Media and merged it with their existing comics publishing division, thus becoming Britain's largest comic book publisher. By 1999–2000 the resultant company was focusing on reprint and licensed material titles such as World produced. Annuals continued to be published, but by 2001 any mention of the old World name was removed from the company logos.

Titles published (selected)

Ongoing titles 
 Billy the Kid Adventure Magazine (76 issues, 1953–1959) – reprints from the Toby Press title of the same name
 Black Diamond Western (31 issues, 1949– — reprints Lev Gleason Publications title of the same name
 Cisco Kid (51 issues, 1952-1955) — reprints of the Dell Comics title of the same name
 Gene Autry and Champion (34 issues, 1956–1958) — reprints of the Dell title of the same name
 Indian Chief (featuring White Eagle) (31 issues, 1953–1954) — reprints of the Dell title of the same name
 John Wayne Adventure Comics (82 issues, 1950– 1957) — reprints from the Toby Press title of the same name
 The Lone Ranger (66 issues, 1953–1958) — reprints from the Dell title of the same name
 A Movie Classic (88 issues, 1956–1959) — adaptations of popular movies
 Red Ryder Comics (62 issues, 1954–1959) — reprints from the Dell title of the same name
 Roy Rogers Comics (100 issues, 1951–1959) — reprinting the Dell Comic of the same name
 Super Thriller Comic (22 issues, 1947–1950) — numbering continues from Superthriller (Foldes); numbering continues with Western Super Thriller Comics
 Tom Corbett, Space Cadet (11 issues, 1953–1954) — reprints from the Dell Comics title
 Tonto (32 issues, 1953-1955) — reprinting the Dell Comics of the same name
 Walt Disney Series (52 issues, 1956– 1959) — reprints from the Dell Comics series
 Western Classic (39 issues, 1950– 1952)
 Western Roundup Comic (42 issues,  1955-1958) — reprints from the Dell title of the same name
 Western Super Thriller Comics (49 issues, 1950- 1954) — continuing the numbering from Super Thriller Comic
 Zane Grey's Stories of the West (31 issues, 1953-1954)

Illustrated World Library series 
 Illustrated Romance Library (23 issues,  1965– 1970)
 Picture Romance (198 issues, 1970–1975)
 Sundance Western (117 issues, 1970–1979)
 Thriller (86 issues, 1965– 1977)
 War Hero (84 issues, 1970– 1977)

World Adventure Library 
 Batman World Adventure Library (11 issues, 1966– 1967)
 Bonanza World Adventure Library (3 issues, 1967)
 Flash Gordon World Adventure Library (8 issues, 1967)
 Man from U.N.C.L.E. World Adventure Library (14 issues– 1967)
 Mandrake the Magician World Adventure (8 issues, 1967) — reprints from the newspaper strip by Lee Falk
 Phantom World Adventure Library (8 issues, 1967)
 Superman World Adventure Library (4 issues, 1967)
 Tarzan World Adventure Library (4 issues, 1967) — reprints from Dell/Gold Key series

Acquired from Famepress 
 Many of the titles acquired from Famepress in 1966 were then taken over by Alex White in 1967/1968; some were canceled.
 Attack! (14 issues, 1966–1967) — acquired with issue #37; continued by Alex White
 Battleground (39 issues, 1966–1967) — acquired with issue #93; series continued by Alex White
 Pecos Bill Picture Library (26 issues, 1966–1967) — acquired with issue #125
 Scotland Yard (20 issues, 1966–1967) — acquired with issue #5
 Top Three Adventure Picture Library (24 issues, 1966–1967) — acquired with issue #110
 Totem  (26 issues, 1966–1967) — acquired (as Totem Picture Library) with issue #77; series continued by Alex White
 Undercover (38 issues, 1967-1968) — acquired with issue #45; series continued by Alex White
 Young Lovers (31 issues, 1966-1967) — acquired with issue # 124; series continued by Alex White

Annuals 
 Basil Brush Annual (10 issues, 1971–1980)
 Bugs Bunny Annual (21 issues, 1951–1983) — reprints from the Dell Comics Bugs Bunny series
 The Dr Who Annual (20 issues, 1965–1985) — contributors included Paul Crompton, Paul Green, and John Fasnacht
 The Lone Ranger Annual (13 issues, 1956–1976) — reprints from the Dell Comics series
 Marvel Comics superheroes — reprints from various Marvel Comics superhero titles:
 The Fantastic Four Comic Album (2 issues, 1969–1970)
 The Fantastic Four Comic Annual	(2 issues, 1969–1970)
 Marvel Annual (2 issues, 1974–1975)
 Marvel Comic Album (1 issue, 1975)
 Marvel Comic Annual (3 issues, 1969–1971)
 Marvel Story Book Annual (1 issue, 1967)
 The Pink Panther Annual (10 issues, 1973–1986) — reprints from the Gold Key Comics series
 Star Trek Annual (13 issues, 1969–1985) — reprints from the Gold Key series
 Tom and Jerry Annual (14 issues, 1967–1985) — reprints from the Dell Comics series
 TV Tornado (5 annuals, 1967–1971) — contributions from Denis Gifford  and Mick Anglo
 Wild West Comic Annual (10 issues, 1951–1960) — reprints from a variety of Western comics, including many from Dell's Four Color
 Yogi Bear Annual (17 issues, 1961–1980) — reprints from the Gold Key series
 Thomas the Tank Engine Annual (2 issues, 1979–1980)

Book series

Little Owl Books

Little Owl Superstars

Gordon T. Gopher

Mini World

BraveStarr

The Centurions

Fireman Sam

The Glo Friends

Rainbow

Scooby-Doo

She-Ra, Princess of Power

See also 
 Brown Watson

References

Citations

Sources consulted

External links 
 World Distributors at Comic Vine
 "PEMBERTON / WORLD DISTRIBUTORS – BRITISH PULP FICTION" at Ash Rare Books

1945 establishments in the United Kingdom
Book distributors
British companies established in 1945
Comic book publishing companies of the United Kingdom
Comics industry
Companies based in Manchester
Defunct comics and manga publishing companies
Privately held companies of the United Kingdom
Publishing companies established in 1945